Evonymopsis is a genus of flowering plants belonging to the family Celastraceae.

Its native range is Madagascar.

Species
Species:

Evonymopsis acutifolia 
Evonymopsis humbertii 
Evonymopsis longipes 
Evonymopsis obcuneata

References

Celastraceae
Celastrales genera
Taxa named by Joseph Marie Henry Alfred Perrier de la Bâthie